William Earl Saxton Jr. (born August 13, 1993) is an American football tight end for the New Jersey Generals of the United States Football League (USFL). He played college football at South Alabama. He has been a member of the New York Jets, Washington Redskins, Buffalo Bills, Detroit Lions, San Francisco 49ers, and Seattle Seahawks of the National Football League (NFL); Birmingham Iron of the Alliance of American Football (AAF); and St. Louis BattleHawks of the XFL.

Early years
Saxton graduated from Hueytown High School in Alabama in 2011.

College career
Saxton was selected to the Mississippi Association of Community and Junior Colleges all-state second-team while playing at Itawamba Community College. In his only season, Saxton had 10 receptions, 137 receiving yards  one receiving touchdown. Saxton was selected to the all-Sun Belt Conference first-team and all-league first-team by Phil Steele Publications and College Sports Madness in his junior season at South Alabama.

Professional career

New York Jets
On May 2, 2015, Saxton signed with the New York Jets following the conclusion of the 2015 NFL Draft. On September 6, 2015, Saxton was signed to the practice squad a day after being released.

On October 12, 2015, Saxton was cut from the team. On October 14, Saxton was re-signed to the practice squad after clearing waivers.

On September 3, 2016, Saxton was released by the Jets as part of final roster cuts.

Washington Redskins
The Washington Redskins signed Saxton to their practice squad on September 5, 2016. He signed a futures contract with the Redskins on January 2, 2017. He was waived by the Redskins on May 15, 2017.

Buffalo Bills
On May 24, 2017, Saxton signed with the Buffalo Bills. He was waived on September 2, 2017.

Detroit Lions
On June 4, 2018, Saxton signed with the Detroit Lions. He was waived on June 14, 2018.

San Francisco 49ers
On July 31, 2018, Saxton signed with the San Francisco 49ers. He was released on August 31, 2018.

Birmingham Iron
On November 9, 2018, Saxton signed with the Birmingham Iron of the Alliance of American Football (AAF) for the 2019 season. He was waived before the start of the regular season, but was re-signed on February 20, 2019.

Seattle Seahawks
After the AAF folded in April 2019, he signed with the Seattle Seahawks on August 3, 2019. He was waived on August 31, 2019.

Washington Redskins (second stint)
On October 15, 2019, Saxton was signed to the Washington Redskins practice squad. He was released on November 12.

Seattle Seahawks (second stint)
On November 26, 2019, Saxton was signed to the Seattle Seahawks practice squad. His practice squad contract with the team expired on January 20, 2020.

St. Louis BattleHawks
Saxton was drafted by the St. Louis BattleHawks in the fifth round (38th overall) of the skills phase of the 2020 XFL Draft on October 15, 2019. He signed a contract with the team on January 26, 2020. He had his contract terminated when the league suspended operations on April 10, 2020.

New Jersey Generals
Saxton signed with the New Jersey Generals of the United States Football League on April 19, 2022. He was transferred to the team's active roster on April 22.

Personal life
Saxton is the cousin of former NFL running back and former assistant coach Tony Nathan.

References

External links
 South Alabama Jaguars bio
 New York Jets bio

1993 births
Living people
American football tight ends
Buffalo Bills players
Detroit Lions players
New York Jets players
People from Hueytown, Alabama
Players of American football from Alabama
San Francisco 49ers players
South Alabama Jaguars football players
Washington Redskins players
Birmingham Iron players
Seattle Seahawks players
St. Louis BattleHawks players
New Jersey Generals (2022) players